Sten Sture Andersson (20 April 1923 – 16 September 2006) was a Swedish social democratic politician, who served as Minister for Foreign Affairs 1985–1991 and as President of the Nordic Council in 1994.

He worked closely with Olof Palme, and became known internationally for his support of Palestinian independence. In November 2010 he was posthumously awarded the Star of Jerusalem, the highest Palestinian order, by Mahmoud Abbas.

He was awarded the Illis quorum in 1995.

Death
Andersson died suddenly from a heart attack on 16 September 2006 in Stockholm.

Appointments
Minister for Foreign Affairs (1985-1991)
Minister for Social Affairs (1982-1985)
Member of the Riksdag (1966-1994)
Member of the executive committee of the Social Democrat Party (1962-1993)
Secretary of the Social Democrat Party (1962-1982)

References

External links

1923 births
2006 deaths
Politicians from Stockholm
Members of the Riksdag from the Social Democrats
Swedish Ministers for Foreign Affairs
Swedish Ministers for Social Affairs
Members of the Första kammaren
Recipients of the Illis quorum